John "Johhny" Malpass (birth unknown – death unknown) was an English professional rugby league footballer who played in the 1930s and 1940s, and coached in the 1940s, 1950s and 1960s.

Background
John Malpass was born in Featherstone, West Riding of Yorkshire, England.

Playing career

County honours
John Malpass won cap(s) for Yorkshire while at Wakefield Trinity.

County Cup Final appearances
John Malpass played right-, i.e. number 3, in Wakefield Trinity's 2-9 defeat by York in the 1936–37 Yorkshire County Cup Final during the 1936–37 season at Headingley Rugby Stadium, Leeds on Saturday 17 October 1936.

Club career
John Malpass made his début for the Featherstone Rovers on Saturday 7 January 1933, he made his début for Wakefield Trinity during August 1936, he appears to have scored no drop-goals (or field-goals as they are currently known in Australasia), but prior to the 1974–75 season all goals, whether; conversions, penalties, or drop-goals, scored 2-points, consequently prior to this date drop-goals were often not explicitly documented, therefore '0' drop-goals may indicate drop-goals not recorded, rather than no drop-goals scored. In addition, prior to the 1949–50 season, the archaic field-goal was also still a valid means of scoring points.

Coaching career

County Cup Final appearances
John Malpass was the coach in the Featherstone Rovers' 0-10 defeat by Halifax in the 1963–64 Yorkshire County Cup Final during the 1963–64 season at Belle Vue, Wakefield on Saturday 2 November 1963.

References

External links
Search for "Malpass" at rugbyleagueproject.org

English rugby league coaches
English rugby league players
Featherstone Rovers coaches
Featherstone Rovers players
Rugby league players from Featherstone
Rugby league centres
Rugby league wingers
Wakefield Trinity coaches
Wakefield Trinity players
Year of birth missing
Year of death missing
Yorkshire rugby league team players